Twee Jonge Gezellen (TJ) is a family owned farm in the pioneer district of Tulbagh in the Western Cape, South Africa. The estate has been in the same family since 1710. Translated from Dutch, the name means Two Young Bachelors. The farm was started by two young bachelor cousins in 1710. Locals referred to the farm as "the place where the two young bachelors stay," and the name stuck. Their direct descendants, the Krone family, now run the farm and produce the wines. In September, 2011 the farm was placed under provisional liquidation after their Land Bank loan could not be repaid.

References

Economy of the Western Cape
Wineries of South Africa
Family-owned companies